Madame Spy is a 1942 American spy film directed by Roy William Neill and starring Constance Bennett, Don Porter and John Litel. The screenplay concerns an American intelligence officer who goes undercover and infiltrates a ring of Nazi spies.

Plot
The film opens with war correspondent David Bannister marrying Joan during an air raid in England. When they return to the U.S., their ocean liner is sunk by a German submarine. They and others escape aboard lifeboats and are rescued.

David becomes a radio reporter and does an exposé on the Nazi connections of an American industrialist who is an associate of Alicia Rolf, Joan's close friend. Peter, the head of a Nazi spy ring, then kills the industrialist to protect the espionage organization. David begins to suspect Joan of having Nazi sympathies, but his friend Lt. Cmdr. Drake defends her. David's suspicions worsen when he discovers Joan has received a telegram telling her about an espionage bombing on the West Coast.

David and his taxicab driver friend, Mike, trail Joan to a meeting with Carl Gordon, who was also a passenger on the sunk liner. David is sure Joan is unfaithful to him. When Drake is killed, newspapers claim he was investigating a Nazi spy ring.

Peter asks Joan to stay with him at his country home, and she agrees. David and Mike follow, and are captured. Before Peter can kill them, he is himself felled by an assassin's bullet. David alerts the FBI to the spy ring, but is told that all the Nazis have already been captured. The agent tells David that Joan and Carl are both American spies, who were working to break the ring. David and Joan reconcile.

Main cast
 Constance Bennett as Joan Bannister  
 Don Porter as David Bannister 
 John Litel as Peter Rolf 
 Edward Brophy as Mike Reese  
 John Eldredge as Carl Gordon 
 Edmund MacDonald as Lt. Cmdr. Bill Drake  
 Nana Bryant as Alicia Rolf  
 Jimmy Conlin as Winston 
 Selmer Jackson as Harrison K. Woods 
 Nino Pipitone as Miro  
 Cliff Clark as Inspector Varden 
 John Dilson as Proprietor Martin

References

Bibliography
 Milberg, Doris. World War II on the Big Screen. McFarland, 2010.

External links

1942 films
American spy films
1940s spy films
Films directed by Roy William Neill
Films set in Russia
Universal Pictures films
World War II spy films
World War II films made in wartime
American black-and-white films
Films scored by Hans J. Salter
1940s English-language films